The meridian 168° east of Greenwich is a line of longitude that extends from the North Pole across the Arctic Ocean, Asia, the Pacific Ocean, New Zealand, the Southern Ocean, and Antarctica to the South Pole.

The 168th meridian east forms a great circle with the 12th meridian west.

From Pole to Pole
Starting at the North Pole and heading south to the South Pole, the 168th meridian east passes through:

{| class="wikitable plainrowheaders"
! scope="col" width="130" | Co-ordinates
! scope="col" | Country, territory or sea
! scope="col" | Notes
|-
| style="background:#b0e0e6;" | 
! scope="row" style="background:#b0e0e6;" | Arctic Ocean
| style="background:#b0e0e6;" |
|-
| style="background:#b0e0e6;" | 
! scope="row" style="background:#b0e0e6;" | East Siberian Sea
| style="background:#b0e0e6;" |
|-valign="top"
| 
! scope="row" | 
| Chukotka Autonomous Okrug — Ayon Island and the mainland Kamchatka Krai — from 
|-
| style="background:#b0e0e6;" | 
! scope="row" style="background:#b0e0e6;" | Bering Sea
| style="background:#b0e0e6;" |
|-
| 
! scope="row" | 
| Kamchatka Krai — Medny Island
|-valign="top"
| style="background:#b0e0e6;" | 
! scope="row" style="background:#b0e0e6;" | Pacific Ocean
| style="background:#b0e0e6;" | Passing just east of Kwajalein Atoll,  (at )
|-
| 
! scope="row" | 
| Namu Atoll
|-valign="top"
| style="background:#b0e0e6;" | 
! scope="row" style="background:#b0e0e6;" | Pacific Ocean
| style="background:#b0e0e6;" | Passing just west of Namdrik Atoll,  (at )
|-valign="top"
| style="background:#b0e0e6;" | 
! scope="row" style="background:#b0e0e6;" | Coral Sea
| style="background:#b0e0e6;" | Passing just west of the island of Méré Lava,  (at ) Passing just west of the island of Maewo,  (at )
|-
| 
! scope="row" | 
| Aoba Island
|-valign="top"
| style="background:#b0e0e6;" | 
! scope="row" style="background:#b0e0e6;" | Coral Sea
| style="background:#b0e0e6;" | Passing just west of Pentecost Island,  (at )
|-
| 
! scope="row" | 
| Island of Ambrym
|-valign="top"
| style="background:#b0e0e6;" | 
! scope="row" style="background:#b0e0e6;" | Coral Sea
| style="background:#b0e0e6;" | Passing just east of the island of Malakula,  (at ) Passing just west of the island of Epi,  (at ) Passing just west of the island of Efate,  (at )
|-
| 
! scope="row" | 
| Island of Maré
|-valign="top"
| style="background:#b0e0e6;" | 
! scope="row" style="background:#b0e0e6;" | Pacific Ocean
|-
| 
! scope="row" | 
| South Island
|-
| style="background:#b0e0e6;" | 
! scope="row" style="background:#b0e0e6;" | Foveaux Strait
| style="background:#b0e0e6;" |
|-
| 
! scope="row" | 
| Stewart Island/Rakiura
|-
| style="background:#b0e0e6;" | 
! scope="row" style="background:#b0e0e6;" | Pacific Ocean
| style="background:#b0e0e6;" |
|-
| style="background:#b0e0e6;" | 
! scope="row" style="background:#b0e0e6;" | Southern Ocean
| style="background:#b0e0e6;" |
|-
| 
! scope="row" | Antarctica
| Ross Dependency, claimed by 
|-
| style="background:#b0e0e6;" | 
! scope="row" style="background:#b0e0e6;" | Southern Ocean
| style="background:#b0e0e6;" | Ross Sea
|-
| 
! scope="row" | Antarctica
| Ross Dependency, claimed by 
|-
|}

See also
167th meridian east
169th meridian east

e168 meridian east